Agios Ioannis is a village and a beach resort on the east coast of Pelion in Magnesia, Greece.  It forms part of the community of Agios Dimitrios Piliou in the municipality of Zagora-Mouresi. 

Agios Ioannis is one of the most popular beaches in Pelion.  It has a small port used by fishing boats and yachts.

External links

References

Populated places in Pelion
Beaches of Greece